(stylized as i☆Ris) is a Japanese voice acting and singing female idol group, formed in 2012 by Avex.

The group currently consists of five members: Saki Yamakita, Yu Serizawa, Himika Akaneya, Yūki Wakai, and Miyu Kubota. The leader is Saki Yamakita.  It was labeled a "hybrid group", because of the members' work as voice actresses in addition to performing as singing idols. They provide the voices for main characters in the arcade game and anime franchise PriPara. The group has also performed themes for the anime series Magical Girl Site , Magical Sempai, and Twin Star Exorcists.

History 
The group was formed as a result of the  that was held in 2012 (of the six successful candidates).  On November 7, 2012, the group debuted with its first single titled "Color" (on the label Avex).  Their third single "Rainbow" was released on August 21, 2013.

On January 21, 2021, it was announced that Azuki Shibuya would graduate from the group on March 31.

On November 7, 2022, during the "Iris 10th Anniversary Live~a Live~" concert, an anime film titled Iris the Movie -Full Energy!!- was announced and will premiere in Japanese theaters in 2024.

Members

Current members 
  - Leader

Former members

Timeline

Discography

Singles

Albums

DVDs / Blu-ray Discs

References

External links 
 
 Profile on the Oricon website

Japanese musical groups
Japanese girl groups
Japanese idol groups
Musical groups established in 2012
Anime singers
Avex Group artists
2012 establishments in Japan